Song Maodang is a Chinese swimmer. At the 2012 Summer Paralympics he won a silver medal at the Men's 4 × 100 metre freestyle relay 34pts event and a bronze medal at the Men's 100 metre butterfly S8 event. At the 2016 Summer Paralympics he won a gold medal at the Men's 100 metre Butterfly S8 event with a world record and paralympic record of 59.19. He also won a silver medal at the Men's 100m Freestyle S8 event with 58.13.

References

Living people
Swimmers at the 2016 Summer Paralympics
Medalists at the 2016 Summer Paralympics
Paralympic gold medalists for China
Paralympic silver medalists for China
Paralympic bronze medalists for China
Paralympic swimmers of China
Chinese male butterfly swimmers
S8-classified Paralympic swimmers
Chinese male freestyle swimmers
Year of birth missing (living people)
Medalists at the 2012 Summer Paralympics
Paralympic medalists in swimming
21st-century Chinese people